Erlenmoos is a municipality in the district Biberach, Baden-Württemberg, Germany. It is near Ochsenhausen. Its mayor is Mrs. Alexandra Scherer. Erlenmoos has about 1000 inhabitants. The villages of Edenbachen, Eichbühl and Oberstetten belong to Erlenmoos.
Erlenmoos used to belong to Ochsenhausen Abbey.

Notable people 

 Gerhard Hess (1731–1802), Benediktiner monk and Historian, born in Oberstetten

References

Biberach (district)
Württemberg